Jeremy McGrath (born November 19, 1971) is one of the most popular American Motocross/Supercross champions in the history of the sport, racking up seven Supercross championships. He was most active in the 1990s earning the title the "King of Supercross".

McGrath did not start riding motocross until the age of 14 because he spent his younger years riding BMX. This experience helped him revolutionize the way supercross was ridden, employing a technique he learned in BMX allowing him to stay a foot or two lower over jumps by coming in with more speed then soaking up the landing into his body similar to the way you ride BMX. One of his BMX "tricks" during jumps on the supercross track, the most famous of which he called the "Nac Nac", helped spawn the sport of freestyle motocross. McGrath won the AMA Pro Athlete of the Year Award in 1996.

Still competitive in Motorcycle racing, McGrath has tried his hand in many types of motorcycle competition. Lately, he has expanded into off-road trucks in the Pro 2WD division of the LOORS Series and occasionally tries his hand at stock car racing. McGrath has the privilege of being the first rookie ever to win the AMA 250cc Supercross Championship, in 1993.

MX career
McGrath began racing motocross at the age of 15 after a successful career in BMX. He placed 8th in the 125cc West Region Supercross season of 1989. In 1990 he won his first supercross race and placed 2nd in that season. McGrath won the 125 West Supercross title in 1991 and 1992.

McGrath won a record of seventy-two 250cc Main Events and captured seven 250cc supercross championships between 1993 and 2000, a time now known as the "McGrath Era".. He also won the 1995 250 Outdoor Motocross Championship and had the 1996 title in sight before a late-season injury handed the title to Jeff Emig. He described the loss as follows: "I get mad at myself a little bit because I should've won the '96 title too, but I was thinking I was invincible and tried a jump at Millville that I never should have attempted and got injured." McGrath also participated in two victories by the U.S. team at the Motocross des Nations –1993 in Austria and 1996 in Spain. His 1998, 1999, 2000 seasons with The Chaparral Motorsports race team was the 1st non-factory team, in the history of the sport, to win a Supercross Championship

He started the 2001 season in typically strong form; winning 2 of the first 3 main events. However, he lost the next event to Team Kawasaki's Ricky Carmichael. Carmichael would then win every race from there on out; dethroning McGrath as Supercross champion and equalling his 1996 win record of 13 consecutive main event victories. McGrath returned in 2002 to take a shot at regaining his crown, but chronic arm pump (Compartment Syndrome) and perhaps age caught up with him, and he could only muster a 3rd place in the final standings behind Carmichael and Yamaha's David Vuillemin.

For 2003, he signed with Team KTM, but a pre-season crash on the much-maligned KTM 250SX made him rethink his future in racing and he decided to retire on the eve of the 2003 Supercross season. He did a farewell tour with KTM to show his appreciation and sign autographs for fans.

He holds the second best record for most combined AMA Supercross and motocross victories with 89 career wins; only Ricky Carmichael has won more.

In 2005, McGrath came out of retirement to race a limited schedule on the Supercross circuit. He rejoined forces with his former Team Honda squad and has recently proven to be at a competitive level and speed that has not been seen from McGrath since the 2001 season. At the age of 34, he placed regularly in the top 5 positions. In the same year, Jeremy also raced Supermoto in the X-Games and placed 2nd to take home the silver medal. McGrath switched motorcycles from his trademark Honda CR250R 2-stroke to a Honda CRF450R 4-stroke at Round 3 of the 2006 Supercross season. In keeping with his partial schedule, McGrath withdrew from the series after Round Six, after earning multiple top 5 finishes, and running as high as fourth in the point standings. Jeremy competed in the 2006 Summer X Games; earning a 2nd in Step-Up and 7th in Supermoto. He announced plans for the McGrath Invitational; an off-season supercross race with an innovative track and huge purse. McGrath announced that the 2006 Invitational would be the final professional Supercross race of his career. McGrath was inducted into the AMA Motorcycle Hall of Fame in 2003.

Career highlights

 250cc AMA Supercross Championships: 7 (1993, 1994, 1995, 1996, 1998, 1999 and 2000)
 125cc AMA Western Region SX Championships: 2 (1991 and 1992)
 250cc AMA National Motocross Championships: 1 (1995)
 FIM World SX Championships: 2
 Member of Winning US Motocross des Nations Team: 2 (1993 and 1996)

Overall AMA Career Wins: 89

 250cc AMA Supercross wins: 72
 125cc Western Region SX wins: 13
 250cc AMA National Motocross wins: 15
 125cc AMA National Motocross wins: 2

In April 2007, McGrath announced he had signed a driver development contract with the NASCAR team JR Motorsports owned by Dale Earnhardt Jr. And1 brand with Monster Energy Drink sponsoring.

McGrath has occasionally raced in off-road races in the late 2000s. He has finished in the Top 10 in several PRO-2 races. In 2017, he won the championship in the Pro 2 division of the Lucas Oil Off Road Racing Series.

Books
He wrote an autobiography with Chris Palmer called "Wide Open: A Life In Supercross". It talks about his life going through the ranks as a rookie to his current day life.
Former Dirt Rider editor-in-chief Ken Faught, a long-time friend of the McGrath family, wrote "Images of a Champion". The book documents his on-and-off track activities including car racing, hillclimbing and supermoto.

Pole Position Raceway
In September 2005, McGrath teamed up with long-time friends Ken Faught and Jason Williams to create a state-of-the-art indoor go-kart track called Pole Position Raceway. The track uses environmentally friendly electric karts that produce 20-horsepower.

Awards
McGrath was inducted into the Motorsports Hall of Fame of America in 2010.

Notes

References

External links

 Jeremy McGrath - AMA Motorcycle Museum Hall of Fame
 Official Jeremy McGrath Website Community

1971 births
Living people
AMA Motocross Championship National Champions
American motocross riders
Freestyle motocross riders
People from Encinitas, California
Racing drivers from San Francisco
X Games athletes